Srbija is the native name of Serbia.

Srbija may also refer to:
 1564 Srbija, an asteroid

See also 
 Serbia (disambiguation)